Ye'Zareyitu Ethiopia (or Yezareytu Ityopya, "Ethiopia Today"; Amharic: የዛሬዪቱ ኢትዮጵያ) was an Amharic language weekly newspaper in Ethiopia founded in 1952. It was also produced in a French language version L'Ethiope d'Aujourd'hui. In 1982 UNESCO recorded the paper as having a circulation of 30,000.

Notable editors in chief
Baalu Girma

References

Weekly newspapers published in Ethiopia
1952 establishments in Ethiopia
Newspapers established in 1952
Amharic-language newspapers
French-language newspapers published in Africa